Martini may refer to:

 Martini (cocktail)
 Martini (vermouth), a brand of vermouth
 Martini (surname), an Italian surname
 Martini (automobile company), a Swiss automobile company
 Automobiles Martini, a French manufacturer of racing cars
 Martini Racing, motor racing teams sponsored by Martini & Rossi
 Martini (quartet), the 2012 Sweet Adelines International champion quartet
 MARTINI, a molecular dynamics force field in chemistry
 Mārtiņi, a Latvian holiday
 Martini–Henry, a rifle

See also 
 Martini lattice, a regular two-dimensional lattice used in statistical mechanics problems such as percolation
 Martini's law, relates the depth of a dive to the effects of nitrogen narcosis
 Martiny Township, Michigan
 Martinis (disambiguation)

eo:Latva mitologio#Sezonoj kaj sezonaj festoj